Abdelrahman Mohamed Homayed (born 15 January 2000) is an Egyptian male handball player. He is 195 cm tall and weighs around 95kg. He is a member of the Al Ahly SC. He was a part of the Egyptian National team that won the 2019 Men's Youth World Handball Championship.  He also played at 2019 Men's Junior World Handball Championship, where the team stood at 3rd position. He won the best goalkeeper in the world trophy at the 2019 Handball World Youth Championship.

Abdelrahman Mohamed  also won man of the match trophy in the 2021-2022 Egyptian league final four matches during Al Ahly's match vs ASC.

References 

Egyptian male handball players
Living people
2000 births
21st-century Egyptian people